Ilya Drozdihin (30 September 1978, Moscow) is a bell-ringer in Moscow and director of the church bell ringers Moscow School Center of Bell Art. He is the artistic director of the Moscow festival of bells in Perezvon.

Biography 

He began working as a bell-ringer in 2002.

From 2003 to 2005 - bell-ringer of Patriarchal town house in Orekhovo-Borisov, Moscow.

Beginning in  2005 he served as the artistic director of the Moscow festival of bells «Perezvon».

Beginning in 2006 he served as senior bell-ringer of the Moscow Church of Our Lady «Znamenie», Moscow.

Beginning in 2008 he served as head of the School of Church Bell-Ringers.

Festivals  
 «Kamensk-Ural» (2005)
 «Perezvon» (2005)
 «Kamensk-Ural» (2006)
 «Alexis chimes» (2006) 
 «Dnіprovsky dzvіn» (2006)
 «Perezvon» (2007)
 «Alexis chimes» (2007)
 «Kamensk-Ural» (2007)
 «Dnіprovsky dzvіn» (2007)
 «Alexis chimes» (2008)
 «Perezvon» (2008) — organizer
 «Perezvon» (2009) — organizer
 «Perezvon» (2010) — organizer
 «Perezvon» (2011) — organizer
 «Alexis chimes» (2011)

Discography 

 Chimes of Patriarchal town house the Millennium of Christianity in Russia, Moscow, CD (2005)
 Tsaritsyno Bells, Moscow, CD (2006)
 The Birth of a Bell, DVD (2007)
 Crystal Bells, Birobidzhan, CD (2010)
 Bells of St. Nicholas church in Buturlin, CD (2011)
 Leonov bells, Moscow, CD (2011)
 Chimes from Kaliningrad to Kamchatka, CD (2011)
 Educational film, DVD (2011)

References

External links 
 Interview «Sobranie», № 2 (8) 2006
 Interview with the "Church Bulletin», № 22 (371) November 2007
 The Silver case  //«Solidarity», № 45 (03/12/08)
 Perezvon Festival
 Biography of Ilya
 «Lazy weekdays», with Ilya Drozdihin, presenter - Leonid Kaganov 

Bellringers
1978 births
Living people